Mleczna is a river in central Poland, and it is a right tributary of the Radomka river. It has a length of 27.8 km and a basin area of ca. 300 km2 (all in Poland). The Mleczna has its source at a hill near Kowala and it empties into Radomka near Lisów. In the latter half of the 8th century an early mediaeval town was built in the valley of the Mleczna River, in the heart of present-day Radom.

Main tributaries:
Pacynka
Kosówka
Potok Malczewski
Potok Południowy
Potok Północny

Additional:
Strumień Godowski'''

Rivers of Poland
Rivers of Masovian Voivodeship